Argosy or The Argosy may refer to:

Arts, entertainment and media
Argosy (magazine), an American pulp magazine 1882–1978 and revived 1990–1994, 2004–2006
Argosy (UK magazine), three British magazines
 Argosy spaceship in Escape Velocity (video game)
The Argosy (newspaper), newspaper published in British Guiana 1880-1907
Argosy (band), a British band active in 1969 which consisted of Roger Hodgson and Elton John

Businesses and organisations
 Argosy Book Store, New York City, U.S.
Argosy Films, a 1940s Australian production company
Argosy Foundation, formerly the Abele Family Charitable Trust
Argosy Gaming Company, a former American casino operator
Argosy Empress Casino, a riverboat casino
Argosy Pictures, John Ford's film company
Argosy University, educational institutions in North America
Argosy Components Ltd, Broadcast equipment manufacturer and distributor in the UK

Transportation
 Armstrong Whitworth Argosy, a 1920/30s British biplane airliner
 Armstrong Whitworth AW.660 Argosy, a British post-War military transport/cargo aircraft
 Airstream Argosy, an American 1970s motorhome
 Freightliner Argosy, a truck
  a steamship formerly known as SS Empire Asquith
, a steamship

Other uses
 Argosy (word), a merchant ship or a fleet of such ships 
 Argosy Glacier, in Antarctica
 Argosy Mountain, in Montana

See also 

 The Golden Argosy, a 1955 short story anthology 
Argonauts, a band of heroes in Greek mythology